Shashikant Khandkar (born 10 December 1961) is an Indian cricketer. He played in 87 first-class and 32 List A matches for Uttar Pradesh from 1979/80 to 1993/94.

See also
 List of Uttar Pradesh cricketers

References

External links
 

1961 births
Living people
Indian cricketers
Uttar Pradesh cricketers
Sportspeople from Kanpur